Oliver Grace, of Shanganagh, (now Gracefield) was chosen in 1689 as the representative in Parliament of the borough of Ballynakill, in the Queen's County, Ireland.

Political career
Oliver Grace was Chief Remembrancer of the Irish Exchequer and a member of the Privy Council of King James II.
Although a supporter of Catholic King James II during the Williamite War in Ireland, Oliver Grace was trusted and respected by the Protestant Landed Gentry of Queen's County.  When the Jacobites held the upper hand in Ireland, several large Protestant estates were assigned over to him in trust whose proprietors relied solely on his honor for their restoration.  When the forces of William of Orange ultimately triumphed, Irish Protestants prevailed on King William III to grant Oliver Grace a pardon for his adherence to James II, which he received on 21 May 1696.

Ancestry and family

Oliver Grace's 3rd great-grandfather, Sir Oliver Grace, was Knight of Ballylinch and Legan Castles, County Kilkenny, Lord of Carney, Tipperary, and Member of Parliament (MP) for that county in 1559. He married Mary, daughter of Sir Gerald Fitzgerald, 3rd Lord Decies, by his wife Ellice, daughter of Piers Butler, 8th Earl of Ormonde.

Oliver Grace married Elizabeth, only surviving child of John Bryan, of Bawnmore, County Kilkenny, and by her had issue:
 Michael, his heir, who died on 19 November 1760
 Robert
 Sheffield, who died in 1699
 Lettice, who married John Grace, feudal baron of Courtstown
 Anne, married first, to Richard, eldest son of Sir Richard Nagle, Secretary of State for Ireland, temp. James II; married secondly, Edmond Butler, 8th Lord Dunboyne, and was mother of the 9th, 10th, and 12th lords
 Ellis, or Alicia, who married Samuel Gale, of the Ashfield Gales, Queen's County

Oliver Grace died on 8 June 1708 and is buried in the south wing of Arles Church (or Grace's Chapel) of which he was the founder.

Oliver's descendants included the Grace baronets from 1818 to 1977.

References

Ancestry

Family Links

 On Grace Depend, Descendants of Oliver Grace

Bibliography

Year of birth uncertain
1700s deaths
Members of the Parliament of Ireland (pre-1801) for Queen's County constituencies
Irish MPs 1689
Members of the Privy Council of Ireland